Tamira Slaby (born 6 March 1992) is a Paralympian athlete from Germany competing mainly in T38 sprint events. She has competed in two Summer Paralympics, 2008 and 2012, and won silver medals in both the 100m and 200m in the 2012 European Championships.

History
Slaby was born in Essen in Germany in 1992. Slaby, who has cerebral palsy, began racing at the age of 13 when she joined the athletics club TV Wattenscheid based in Bochum.

References

External links
 

1992 births
Paralympic athletes of Germany
German female sprinters
Living people
Sportspeople from Essen
Athletes (track and field) at the 2008 Summer Paralympics
Athletes (track and field) at the 2012 Summer Paralympics
Track and field athletes with cerebral palsy
Medalists at the World Para Athletics European Championships